The 2016–17 Grand Canyon Antelopes men's basketball team represented Grand Canyon University during the 2016–17 NCAA Division I men's basketball season. They were led by head coach Dan Majerle in his fourth season at Grand Canyon. The Antelopes played their home games at the GCU Arena in Phoenix, Arizona as members of the Western Athletic Conference.

The season was their fourth and final year of a four-year transition period from Division II to Division I. As a result, the Antelopes were not eligible for the NCAA postseason play and could not participate in the WAC tournament. They could have played in the CIT or CBI had they been invited.

They finished the season 22–9, 11–3 in WAC play to finish in a tie for second place. Citing injuries, they decided to not participate in a postseason tournament. They had participated in the CIT the previous three seasons.

Previous season
The Antelopes finished the 2015–16 season 27–7, 11–3 in WAC play to finish in a tie for second place. They were invited to the CollegeInsider.com Tournament and defeated South Carolina State and Jackson State to advance to the quarterfinals where they lost to Coastal Carolina.

Departures

Incoming transfers

Incoming recruits

Roster

Schedule and results

|-
!colspan=12 style=| Exhibition

|-
!colspan=12 style=| Regular season

References

Grand Canyon Antelopes men's basketball seasons
Grand Canyon
Grand Canyon Antelopes men's basketball
2017 in sports in Arizona